MBM may refer to:

Businesses and organisations
 MBM (architecture firm), a Spanish company
 Meadowbrook Meat Company, a subsidiary of McLane Company
 McKee-Berger-Mansueto, an American construction company
 MBM scandal
 M.B.M. Engineering College, in Jodhpur, India

Sports
 MBM (automobile), a Swiss Formula One racing car
 MBM Motorsports, an American stock car racing team

Other uses
 MBM (file format), a container for a set of bitmap images
 Master of Business and Management, a postgraduate degree
 Mambalam railway station, Chennai, Tamil Nadu, India, station code MBM
 Meat and bone meal, a product of the rendering industry
 Meat Beat Manifesto, a British electronic music group
 Miri City Council (Majlis Bandaraya Miri), a city council in Sarawak, Malaysia
 Mbama language, ISO 639-3 language code mbm

See also